Korg is a fictional character appearing in American comic books published by Marvel Comics. Created by writer Greg Pak and artist Carlo Pagulayan, the character first appeared in The Incredible Hulk (2000) #93 (cover date May 2006) during the "Planet Hulk" storyline.

Taika Waititi portrays Korg, through the use of motion capture, in the Marvel Cinematic Universe films Thor: Ragnarok (2017), Avengers: Endgame (2019) and Thor: Love and Thunder (2022), and the short film Deadpool and Korg React (2021). Waititi also voices an alternate-timeline version of the character in the Disney+ animated series What If...? (2021).

Publication history
Created by Greg Pak and Carlo Pagulayan, Korg was inspired by Thor's origin story and was later retconned in The Incredible Hulk vol. 2 #94 into one of the stone creatures that fought Thor in Journey into Mystery #83 released in 1962.

Fictional character biography
Korg is part of the Kronan race seen in Journey into Mystery #83. After his defeat at the hands of Thor when the Stone Men tried to invade Earth, Korg became a prisoner of the Red King on the alien planet of Sakaar. He was forced into slavery by an obedience disk and made to fight for his life in the gladiatorial arenas. Korg was made to kill his brother Margus against his will, a fact that continues to haunt Korg.

When the Hulk was exiled to the Red King's planet, Korg became the Hulk's ally after he and five others were victorious during one of the gladiator games that rule on the planet as a form of entertainment. Korg was the first to let the group talk to each other, and after more victories in the game, Korg became a gladiator. Still fighting alongside the Hulk, Korg was part of the group that rebelled against the Red King after the Silver Surfer used his Power Cosmic to destroy the disks that controlled the slaves. The Surfer had also been made a slave by such a disk, but it was destroyed by the Hulk when they were forced to battle (in the film adaptation, it was Beta Ray Bill, not the Silver Surfer, using the lightning powers of his hammer, Stormbreaker, to perform this feat).

After the detonation of Sakaar, Korg convinces Hiroim (who has lost hope and wanted to stay and die) to come with him on the space ship. Korg was with the Hulk and the others and managed to knock out Wonder Man. However, after the discovery that Miek had triggered the destruction of Sakaar, Korg and the other surviving Warbound surrendered to S.H.I.E.L.D. custody, only to escape when earthquakes began to tear Manhattan Island apart due to the damage the Hulk had caused. Working with fellow Warbound member Hiroim and Earth hero Thing, Korg was able to heal the damage caused to the island, before he and his fellow Warbound retreated into the sewers.

Korg is also featured in World War Hulk: Frontline as a detective of sorts and is partnered up with a New York detective when investigating the death of Arch-E-5912. In the Avengers: The Initiative issue of World War Hulk, Korg is confronted by his fear when Trauma comes to rescue his fellow Cadets: Korg's worst fear is the Thunder god Thor.

In the miniseries Warbound, he helps in the defeat of the Leader who has turned a city in the middle of the desert into a new Gamma World but at the cost of Hiroim's life.

During the "World War Hulks" storyline, Bruce Banner calls on Korg's help when Leader and MODOK transform an army and many of Earth's heroes into "Hulks", helping subdue them.

During the 2010–2011 "Chaos War" storyline, Korg ends up helping the Hulks and A-Bomb fight a resurrected Abomination and the forces of Amatsu-Mikaboshi. When the Zom part of Doctor Strange is awakened by Amatsu-Mikaboshi, Marlo Chandler ends up using the death fragment to resurrect some of Hulk's allies. One of them is Hiroim as it is shown that Korg and Hiroim had a relationship (although Korg's people have no separate genders).

During the 2016 "Civil War II" storyline, Korg was with the Warbound when they receive word that Bruce Banner is dead. When at Bruce's funeral, Korg stated how Hulk wanted to be left alone and how he made allies that were like family to him.

When the Skrullduggers were emerging from a portal to Weirdworld in a Roxxon facility, Korg appeared to help the Brood-infected human Blake and Roxxon's Man-Thing in preventing the Skrullduggers from emerging from the portal. This was confirmed when Weapon H and Dario Agger came to check up on Blake and Man-Thing. Three days ago, Korg saves some soldiers from the Skrullduggers. His inner monologue states that he came to Weirdworld after hearing that Hulk is back from the dead. In the present, Korg learns from Dario Agger that the Roxxon soldiers are safe in a bunker in Weirdworld. As Weapon H leads the mission to Weirdworld, they are attacked by a tribe of blue-skinned humanoids called the Inaku who blame them for breaking the Earth and allowing the Skrullduggers to take their queen. After Weapon H frees his fellow captives, he has Korg and Titania stay behind to help Man-Thing fortify the Inaku village in case the Skrullduggers show up while Weapon H, Angel, and Blake go on a stealth mission to the Roxxon outpost. He and Titania help the Inaku set up a pit filled with spikes that are coated in berry poison. When the Skrullduggers attack, Man-Thing, Korg, and Titania assist the Inaku in defending their fortified village from the Skrullduggers until they suddenly go in one direction. Korg, Man-Thing, Titania find Weapon H with the Skrullduggers under Morgan le Fay's control as they attack the Inaku village. Thinking that Weapon H is in a battle frenzy, Korg reminds Titania that Weapon H is part-Hulk. When Morgan le Fay of Earth-15238 shows up and is identified as a queen to the Inaku, Titania and Korg are attacked by Protector Hara, the Skrullduggers, and Weapon H. Korg faces off against Weapon H. Korg and Titania catch up to Weapon H where they find that Dario has transformed into Minotaur. When everyone evacuates through the portal during Minotaur's fight with Morgan le Fay, Korg carries Sonia through the portal. After Dario pays them the terms of their contract, Titania takes Blake, Korg, and Man-Thing out to a burger joint down the street.

Powers and abilities
Like all Kronans, Korg possesses a body made of a durable, silicon-based substance that grants him protection against nearly all forms of physical harm and gives him a rock-like appearance. In oxygen-rich atmospheres, Korg also possesses vast super strength almost comparable to Thing. His mineral state also grants him an extremely prolonged lifespan.

When fighting as a gladiator, he mostly relied on his physical power and extremely durable form, rather than actual fighting skills. He is, however, an experienced military strategist and consummate pragmatist, constantly assessing his environment so he can tell what actions are necessary for his continued survival.

Other versions

Marvel Zombies Return
 In Marvel Zombies Return, Hulk, along with the Warbound, reach the moon in hopes to start World War Hulk but instead meet Zombiefied versions of Giant Man and the Immortals. At the start of the battle, Korg is blown to pieces and killed.

What if

 In What if: Planet Hulk, Korg is shown devastated that Miek was killed in the destruction of Sakaar not knowing he was the one responsible. He also participates in the conquering of Earth with Caiera as queen.
 In What if: World War Hulk, Korg and the rest of Warbound are killed after Iron Man didn't hesitate in using the laser and destroys New York.
 In "What if Thor had battled Hulk?", Korg and the rest of the Warbound ended up fighting the Warriors Three until Miek's treachery was known. After Thor had successfully reasoned with Hulk, Korg left with the Warbound to return to Sakaar to rebuild it.

In other media

Television
 Korg appears in The Super Hero Squad Show episode "Planet Hulk", voiced by Dave Wittenberg.
 Korg appears in the Hulk and the Agents of S.M.A.S.H. episode "Planet Leader", voiced by Jonathan Adams. This version is a Sakaaran native who the Leader uses as a slave and blames Skaar for helping the Leader conquer Sakaar. After the agents of S.M.A.S.H. end up on Sakaar, they incite a revolution and free the slaves, with Red Hulk convincing Korg to help.

Film
Korg appears in Planet Hulk, voiced by Kevin Michael Richardson.

Marvel Cinematic Universe

Korg appears in media set in the Marvel Cinematic Universe (MCU), voiced and motion captured by Taika Waititi. This version is blue, polite, speaks in a New Zealand accent, and says what is naturally on his mind. Waititi based Korg's voice and mannerisms on Polynesian/Maori New Zealanders, who are usually very soft-spoken and known for using humor.
 Introduced in the live-action film Thor: Ragnarok, Korg appears as one of many gladiators forced to battle each other by the cosmic being and ruler of Sakaar, the Grandmaster. Following his arrival and forced participation, Thor stages an escape, during which his ally Valkyrie helps Korg and the other gladiators incite a rebellion against the Grandmaster. Along the way, Korg and his group hijack the Grandmaster's starship, the Statesman, help Thor's group evacuate Asgard, and join Thor on his journey to find a new home for the Asgardian refugees.
 Korg returns in the live-action film Avengers: Endgame. Five years after surviving Thanos' attack on the Statesman and the Blip off-screen during the events of the live-action film Avengers: Infinity War, he lives with Miek, Thor, and the refugees in New Asgard, Norway. Korg and Miek later assist Thor, the Avengers, and their allies in fighting off an alternate timeline version of Thanos.
 Korg returns in the live-action promotional short film Deadpool and Korg React, in which he reacts to a trailer for the film Free Guy alongside Deadpool, who is attempting to join the MCU.
 Waititi voices alternate timeline versions of Korg in the Disney+ animated series, What If...? In the episode "What If... Thor Were an Only Child?", a variant of Korg appears as an attendee of Thor's party on Earth. In the episode "What If... Ultron Won?", another variant of Korg is briefly shown fighting Ultron's army of Ultron Sentries on Sakaar before he is ultimately killed.
 Korg appears in the live-action film Thor: Love and Thunder. After Gorr attacks New Asgard as part of his quest to kill all gods, Korg joins Thor and their allies in traveling to Omnipotent City to warn Thor's fellow gods. However, they get into a fight with Zeus, who reduces Korg to a head. Once Thor defeats Gorr, Korg has acquired a new body and fallen in love with a fellow Kronan named Dwayne (voiced by Dave Cory).

Video games
 Korg appears as a support character in Marvel Puzzle Quest.
 Korg appears as a playable character in Marvel: Contest of Champions.
 Korg appears in Marvel Snap.

See also
 Planet Hulk
 Warbound
 World War Hulk

References

External links
 Korg at Marvel.com

Characters created by Greg Pak
Comics characters introduced in 2006
Fictional characters with superhuman durability or invulnerability
Fictional gladiators
Fictional military strategists
Marvel Comics aliens
Marvel Comics characters with superhuman strength
Marvel Comics extraterrestrial superheroes
Marvel Comics film characters
Marvel Comics LGBT superheroes
Marvel Comics superheroes